Richard Philip Douglas CB (born 20 November 1956 in York, Yorkshire) is a British former senior civil servant and influential health leader. He previously served as Director General for Finance, Strategy and the NHS at the Department of Health.

Early life

Douglas attended Archbishop Holgate's School in York, and after completing his A-levels, he studied for a BA in English Literature at the University of Hull. After graduating, he married in 1978 and embarked upon his civil service career the same year.

Civil Service career
Douglas started his career in public sector finance in 1978 with HM Customs and Excise, and later the National Audit Office (NAO) where he qualified as an accountant (CIPFA) in 1983. He is a member of the Chartered Institute of Public Finance and Accountancy. In his time with the NAO, he worked in most areas of central government: health, employment, home affairs, defence and agriculture.

In 2001, Douglas joined the Department of Health's board. Retiring from the civil service in April 2015, Douglas was the longest-serving Director General of Finance in the UK Government, having served since 2007. From 2011 to 2014, Douglas also served as head of the Government Finance Profession, a position appointed by HM Treasury.

He was said by the Health Service Journal to be the twelfth most powerful person in the English NHS in December 2013.

In March 2016, Douglas became Deputy Chair of NHS Improvement. During this time, he stepped in as Interim Chair from July–October 2017. In June 2018, he was appointed as a Non-Executive Director at NHS England. He stepped down from the NHS England and NHS Improvement Board in March 2020.

He currently serves as Chair of the South East London integrated care system (ICS), and is responsible for overseeing healthcare planning and delivery at the ICS level.

Personal life
Douglas is married with three children.

In 2003 he was awarded membership of The Gild of Freemen of the City of York, the city in which he was born.

In 2006 he was awarded membership of the Order of the Bath (CB) for services to health at an investiture at Buckingham Palace.

References

Living people
1956 births
Alumni of the University of Hull
Civil servants in the Exchequer and Audit Department
Civil servants in the National Audit Office (United Kingdom)
Civil servants in the Ministry of Health (United Kingdom)
Members of HM Government Finance Service
Companions of the Order of the Bath
Administrators in the National Health Service